Trouble in Mind: The Doc Watson Country Blues Collection (or simply Trouble in Mind) is the title of a recording by American folk music and country blues artist Doc Watson, released in 2003. It contains recordings by Watson in the country blues style.

Track listing
 "Country Blues" (Traditional) – 3:32
 "Sitting on Top of the World" (Sam Chatmon, Walter Vinson) – 2:38
 "Little Sadie" (Traditional) – 1:59
 "Gambler's Yodel" (Alton Delmore, Rabon Delmore) – 2:54
 "Rain Crow Bill" (Whittier) – 1:46
 "My Little Woman, You're So Sweet" (Traditional) – 2:21
 "Lost John" (Traditional) – 3:26
 "Deep River Blues" (Traditional) – 3:38
 "Georgie Buck" (Traditional) – 2:18
 "Anniversary Blue Yodel [Blue Yodel No. 7]" (Jimmie Rodgers) – 2:10
 "Memphis Blues" (Miller) – 1:35
 "Stackolee" (Traditional) – 3:54
 "Worried Blues" (Traditional) – 2:52
 "Spike Driver Blues" (Mississippi John Hurt) – 2:58
 "Never No Mo' Blues" (Rodgers, Williams) – 3:13
 "Honey Babe Blues" (Traditional) – 2:58
 "White House Blues" (Traditional) – 1:55

Personnel
Doc Watson – guitar, banjo, harmonica, vocals
Merle Watson – guitar, banjo
Arnold Watson – banjo
Eric Weissberg – bass

References

2003 compilation albums
Doc Watson compilation albums
Sugar Hill Records compilation albums